Drawsko may refer to:
 Drawsko Pomorskie, a town in West Pomeranian Voivodeship (north-west Poland), seat of Drawsko County
 Drawsko Lake, in West Pomeranian Voivodeship
 Drawsko, Greater Poland Voivodeship, a village in west Poland, seat of Gmina Drawsko

See also
 Nowe Drawsko, a village in West Pomeranian Voivodeship
 Stare Drawsko, a village in West Pomeranian Voivodeship